Aporo Mai FC, sometimes spelt Aporro Mai FC, was a semi-professional association football club based in Hekari Province near Kutubu, Papua New Guinea. The club was founded in 2019, as the feeder club for FC Kutubu.

The club took part in the 2019 Papua New Guinea National Soccer League, where they were drawn into the Highlands Conference. They finished fourth out of six teams.

History 
Coached by former Hekari United coach Mathew Witu, the club was revealed to be taking part in the 2019 edition of the Papua New Guinea National Soccer League in late January 2019 under the sponsorship of Kutubu Security Service Ltd. Before the season began, the club only had one player with NSL experience – former PNG international Samuel Kini. However, on the opening day of the season, the side thrashed Enga Laima 5–0 to go top of the league immediately.

This opening day victory was their only win in the first half of the season, with the side losing their next four matches by two- or one-goal margins, leaving them fifth out of six sides at the halfway stage. On 30 March, the side picked up a 1–0 victory against league leaders Kagua Erave FC, becoming the first team to take any points off Kagua Erave that season. However, this was not enough to revive their campaign fully, and the side finished fourth in the conference with 15 points.

Domestic record

National Competitions 

 Papua New Guinea National Soccer League
2019: Highlands Conference: 4th

Final squad

References 

Football clubs in Papua New Guinea
Association football clubs established in 2019
2019 establishments in Papua New Guinea